Skarø is a Danish island south of Funen. The island can be reached by ferry from Svendborg and Drejø.

Islands of Denmark
Geography of Funen
Geography of Svendborg Municipality